Hakan Erol (born August 10, 1984, Erzurum, Turkey) is an Azerbaijan-origin Turkish musician, composer, arranger and singer.

Biography 
Hakan Erol was born on August 10, 1984, in Erzurum. He graduated from Azerbaijan State University of Culture and Arts in 2005.

Works

Awards

References

External links 
Hakan Erol on Discogs.com

Turkish composers
1984 births
Living people